Heritage Park was a stadium in Colonie, New York, USA.  It was primarily used for baseball but was also used for high school and college football games. It had a capacity of 5,500.

History
Heritage Park opened in 1982 and primarily served as a minor league baseball ballpark. It was home to the Albany-Colonie A's, the Albany-Colonie Yankees, and the Albany-Colonie Diamond Dogs. Since the Diamond Dogs left in 2002, the facility had been without any tenants. Although there had been no regular maintenance, the ballpark stood just west of the Albany International Airport until demolition was completed in 2009. The stadium was supposed to be razed to make way for a new nursing home, but the plans fell through when it was discovered that the property had become too valuable. The contents of Heritage Park were sold at auction in August 2005.

Demolition
In July 2009, demolition of the stadium began. In August 2009, the park demolition was completed.

Tenants
Albany-Colonie A's (1982–84)
Albany-Colonie Yankees (1985–94)
Siena College Football Team (1998–2002)
Albany-Colonie Diamond Dogs (1995–2002)

References

External links
Photographs of Heritage Park - Rochester Area Ballparks

Minor league baseball venues
Baseball venues in New York (state)
1982 establishments in New York (state)
Sports venues completed in 1982
2009 disestablishments in New York (state)
Sports venues demolished in 2009
American football venues in New York (state)
Defunct college football venues
Defunct minor league baseball venues
Defunct baseball venues in the United States
Sports venues in Albany County, New York